Brave New World is a 1932 novel by Aldous Huxley.

Brave New World may also refer to:

 "brave new world", a phrase from Shakespeare's play The Tempest

Film and television 
 Brave New World (1980 film), an American TV adaptation of Huxley's novel, starring Keir Dullea
 Brave New World (1998 film), a 1998 TV adaptation of Huxley's novel
 Brave New World (miniseries), a 1999 American documentary miniseries
 Brave New World, a 1994 UK TV series about bioethics made by Open Media
 Brave New World with Stephen Hawking, a 2011 UK television science documentary series
 Brave New World (2020 TV series), a TV series based on Huxley's novel

Episodes 
 "Brave New World" (Boy Meets World), the two-part series finale of Boy Meets World
 "Brave New World" (Fringe), the two-part finale of the fourth season of Fringe
 "Brave New World" (Grey's Anatomy), the fourth episode of the fifth season of Grey's Anatomy
 "Brave New World" (Heroes), the eighteenth and final episode of the fourth season of Heroes (which also introduces Volume 6, also titled "Brave New World")
 "Brave New World" (Heroes Reborn), the pilot episode of the miniseries Heroes Reborn, which was a spin-off from Heroes
 "Brave New World" (One Tree Hill), the tenth episode of the third season of One Tree Hill
 "Brave New World" (seaQuest 2032), the first episode of the third season of seaQuest DSV
 "Brave New World" (The Vampire Diaries), the second episode of the second season of The Vampire Diaries

Music

Albums 
 Brave New World (Iron Maiden album), or the title song
 Brave New World (The Rippingtons album), or the title song
 Brave New World (Steve Miller Band album), or the title song
 Brave New World (Styx album), or the title song
 Brave New World (Amanda Cook album), or the title song

Songs 
 "Brave New World" (song), by Toyah from The Changeling
 "Brave New World", a song by Technology from Nositel Idey
 "The Opera Song (Brave New World)", by Jurgen Vries and Charlotte Church
 "Brave New World", by Covenant from Skyshaper
 "Brave New World", by Weezer from Hurley
 "Brave New World", by Geri Halliwell, a B-side to the single "It's Raining Men"
 "Brave New World", by Hedley from Famous Last Words
 "Brave New World", by Iron Savior from Iron Savior
 "Brave New World", by Glenn Frey from Strange Weather
 "Brave New World", by Jeff Wayne from Jeff Wayne's Musical Version of The War of the Worlds
 "Brave New World", by Motörhead from Hammered
 "Brave New World", by Reagan Youth from Volume 2
 "Brave New World", by Richard Ashcroft from Alone with Everybody
 "Brave New World", the main theme from the video game Namco × Capcom
 "Brave New World", by Jan Hammer from Beyond the Mind's Eye
 "Brave New World", by Thomas Newman from Skyfall: Original Motion Picture Soundtrack
 "Brave New World", by Watsky and Kush Mody from x Infinity
 "Brave New World", a song by Greta Van Fleet from Anthem of the Peaceful Army
 "Brave New World", a song by New Model Army from The Ghost of Cain
 "Brave New World", a song by Iron Maiden from Brave New World (Iron Maiden album)

Other 
 Brave New World, a television news music package composed by Shelly Palmer
 Brave New World, a band founded by Adam Holzman

Other uses 
 Brave New World (role-playing game), a superhero role-playing game
 DCU: Brave New World, a 2006 comic book released as part of DC Comics' One Year Later event
 Civilization V: Brave New World, an expansion pack for the video game Civilization V
 Project X Zone 2: Brave New World , a crossover tactical role-playing game for the Nintendo 3DS
 Final Fantasy VI: Brave New World, a ROM hack of Final Fantasy VI

See also